Troy Book is a Middle English poem by John Lydgate relating the history of Troy from its foundation through to the end of the Trojan War.  It is in five books, comprising 30,117 lines in ten-syllable couplets.  The poem's major source is Guido delle Colonne's Historia destructionis Troiae.

Background
Troy Book was Lydgate's first full-scale work.  It was commissioned from Lydgate by the Prince of Wales (later Henry V), who wanted a poem that would show the English language to be as fit for a grand theme as the other major literary languages,Ywriten as wel in oure langageAs in Latyn and in Frensche it is.Lydgate tells us that he began writing the poem at four o'clock on the afternoon of Monday, 31 October 1412; he completed it in 1420.

It has been argued that Lydgate intended Troy Book as an attempt to outdo Chaucer's Trojan romance Troilus and Criseyde, and certainly the frequent recurrence of tributes to Chaucer's excellence as a poet is a notable feature of the poem.  The poem emphasizes the disastrous results of political discord and militarism, and also presents the conventional medieval themes of the power of Fortune to influence earthly affairs and the vanity of worldly things.

Publication
Troy Book survives in 23 manuscripts, testifying to the popularity of the poem during the 15th century.  It was printed first by Richard Pynson in 1513, and second by Thomas Marshe in 1555.  A modernized version sometimes attributed to Thomas Heywood, called The Life and Death of Hector, appeared in 1614.  Troy Book exercised an influence on Robert Henryson, Thomas Kyd, and Christopher Marlowe, and was one of Shakespeare's sources for Troilus and Cressida.

Criticism
Modern critics have generally made moderate claims for Troy Book’s literary merit.  Antony Gibbs judged the poem to be of uneven quality, adding that "its couplet form indulges Lydgate's fatal garrulity."  Douglas Gray found some good writing to praise, and particularly singled out the eloquence and pathos of some of Lydgate's rhetorical laments, descriptions, and speeches.

Reference edition
The reference edition of Troy Book is that by Henry Bergen, published as volumes 97, 103, 106 and 126 of the Early English Text Society Extra Series between 1906 and 1935. An excellent, abridged online edition of the "Troy Book" with substantial glosses to aid modern readers is available from the Middle English Texts Series, edited by Robert R. Edwards.

Modern renditions 
Two self-published modernised versions of Troy Book are available:

 John Lydgate's Troy Book: A Middle English Iliad (The Troy Myth in Medieval Britain Book 1) by D M Smith (2019 Kindle) - complete
 John Lydgate Troy Book: The Legend of the Trojan War by D.J. Favager (2019 Kindle) - complete

Notes

Sources

External links 
 Introduction by Robert R. Edwards to the TEAMS edition of selections from Troy Book
 The TEAMS edition
Online abbreviated version in modern English verse by D.J. Favager

Epic poems in English
1420 books
15th-century poems
Middle English poems
Poems about cities
Trojan War literature